Nancy Halliday Ely-Raphel (born 1937) is an American diplomat. She was the United States Ambassador to Slovenia from 1998 to 2001.  From 2001 to 2003, she was the first Director of the U.S. State Department's Office to Monitor and Combat Trafficking in Persons.

Biography

Early life and education
Ely-Raphel was born in 1937 to Margaret Merritt Halliday and Thomas Clarkson Halliday. She has one brother, Thomas Clarkson Halliday III. She graduated from Syracuse University in New York and attended the University of Würzburg in Würzburg, Germany. In 1968, she graduated from University of San Diego School of Law with a juris doctor.

Career
Prior to joining the United States Department of State, she was a San Diego deputy city attorney, an Assistant United States Attorney in the Southern District of California, an Associate Dean of Boston University School of Law, and senior trial attorney with the U.S. Department of Justice's Organized Crime Strike Force.

Between 1975 and 2003, she served in a number of legal and policy positions in the State Department, including Assistant Legal Adviser for African Affairs and Nuclear Affairs, and Principal Deputy Assistant Secretary of State for Democracy, Human Rights and Labor, as well as Legal Adviser to the U.S. Embassy in Pakistan.  From 1995 to 1998 she was Coordinator for Bosnia, and assisted in the implementation of the Dayton Peace Accords.

On June 29, 1998, she was appointed by President Clinton to be the third United States Ambassador to Slovenia.  She presented her credentials on September 2, 1998, and left the post on September 27, 2001.  From 2001 to 2003 she was Senior Advisor to the Secretary of State and the first Director of the State Department's Office to Monitor and Combat Trafficking in Persons, an office that she established. After that, she was the Counselor on International Law in the Department's Office of the Legal Adviser.

Following her State Department service, she served as vice president and managing director of Save the Children.

She is a member of the American Academy of Diplomacy and the Council on Foreign Relations, and is a resident of the District of Columbia.

Personal life
Her first husband was Dr. Robert A. Duff, of Carlsbad, California. In 1971 she married her second husband, the legal scholar John Hart Ely.  In 1987 she married her third husband, Arnold Lewis Raphel, the U.S. Ambassador to Pakistan, but she was widowed on August 17, 1988, when he was killed in a plane crash.  In 2008, Ely-Raphel was described as the "companion of 12 years" of the late diplomat and spy novelist Samuel J. Hamrick, in his obituary.

She has at least one child, Robert Duff Ely, an insurance defense lawyer in New York.

References

External links
 United States Department of State: Chiefs of Mission for Slovenia
 United States Department of State: Slovenia
 United States Embassy in Ljubljana

Ambassadors of the United States to Slovenia
1937 births
Living people
University of San Diego School of Law alumni
Syracuse University alumni
Boston University faculty
People from Washington, D.C.
American women in politics
United States Ambassadors-at-Large
United States Foreign Service personnel
American women ambassadors
American women academics
21st-century American women